St Aloysius' College may refer to:

Asia
 St. Aloysius' College (Edathua), Alleppey, Kerala, India
St. Aloysius College, Thrissur, Thrissur, Kerala, India
 St. Aloysius' College (Galle), Sri Lanka
 St. Aloysius College (Mangalore), India
 St. Aloysius College (Ratnapura), Sri Lanka

Europe
 Gonzaga College, a Jesuit school in County Dublin, Ireland
 Aloisiuskolleg, a Jesuit school in Bad-Godesberg Bonn, Germany
 St. Aloysius College, Athlone, a secondary school in County Westmeath, Ireland
 St Aloysius' College, Glasgow, a Jesuit school in Scotland
 St Aloysius' College, Highgate, in London, England
 St Aloysius' College (Malta), a Jesuit secondary school in Birkirkara
 Sint-Aloysiuscollege, a Catholic secondary school in Geel, Belgium
 Sint-Aloysiuscollege, a Catholic secondary school in Menen, Belgium
 Sint-Aloysiuscollege, a Catholic primary and secondary school in Ninove, Belgium
 Sint-Aloysius College or Aloysius College, The Hague, Netherlands, a Catholic secondary school

North and South America
St. Aloysius College, Antofagasta, Chile
Gonzaga College High School, Washington, D.C.
Gonzaga University, a Jesuit university in Spokane, Washington
Saint Aloysius Gonzaga National University, a Peruvian University in Ica, Peru

Oceania
 St Aloysius' College (Sydney), New South Wales, Australia
 St Aloysius' College (Melbourne), Victoria, Australia
 St Aloysius College, Adelaide, South Australia, Australia
 St Aloysius Catholic College, Hobart, Tasmania, Australia
 St Aloysius College, Wakari, Dunedin, New Zealand

See also
 St Aloysius school (disambiguation)
 St Aloysius (disambiguation)

Educational organizations based in the United States